Sergey Vladimirovich Bolotin (Сергей Владимирович Болотин, born 1 December 1954 in Moscow) is a Russian mathematician, specializing in dynamical systems of classical mechanics.

Biography
Bolotin graduated in 1976 from the Faculty of Mechanics and Mathematics of Moscow State University. There he received in 1981 his Candidate of Sciences degree (PhD) with thesis Либрационные движения обратимых механических систем (Librational motions of reversible mechanical systems). He received in 1998 his Russian Doctor of Sciences degree (habilitation) with thesis Двоякоасимптотические траектории и условия интегрируемости гамильтоновых систем (Double-asymptotic trajectories and integrability conditions for Hamiltonian systems).

Since 1998 Bolotin is a professor in the Department of Theoretical Mechanics, Faculty of Mechanics and Mathematics, Moscow State University. He is now the head of the Mechanics Department of the Steklov Institute of Mathematics. His research deals with dynamical systems of classical mechanics, Hamiltonian systems, and variational methods. He has supervised four PhD (Candidate of Sciences) students. He is the author or coauthor of over 75 scientific publications, including a textbook on theoretical mechanics (2010). He has served on the editorial board of the journal Regular and Chaotic Dynamics.

In 1994 he was an invited speaker with talk Invariant Sets of Hamiltonian Systems and Variational Methods at the International Congress of Mathematicians in Zurich. In 2016 he was elected a corresponding member of the Russian Academy of Sciences.

As a hobby, Bolotin sails in Olympic class Finn dinghies.

His brother Yuri Vladimirovich Bolotin (born December 1, 1954) is a professor at Moscow State University. Both brothers in 2020 became champions of Russia in the class of yachts "Carter 30".

Selected publications

References

1954 births
Living people
Moscow State University alumni
Academic staff of Moscow State University
Academic staff of the Steklov Institute of Mathematics
20th-century Russian mathematicians
21st-century Russian mathematicians
Dynamical systems theorists
Mathematical physicists
Russian male sailors (sport)